The Romanian mafia or Romanian organized crime is the category of organized crime groups whose members are citizens of Romania or living abroad in the Romanian diaspora. In recent years they have expanded their criminal activities in the European Union, reads a Europol report on EU organized crime, being active mostly in Italy, Spain and the United Kingdom. The Romanian Mafia is composed of several major organized groups, which in turn have wider networks throughout Europe and have even reached as far as North and Central America.

Including major heists and some of the biggest scams in history, the Romanian mafia is known worldwide for ATM-skimmings as well as pimping and drug trafficking. Gangs are organized horizontally, the leader of a group being called 'Nașu' which means "Godfather" in Romanian. Some Mafia groups in Romania also known as "Clanuri Interlope" or "Brigăzi" have codes of silence  and also marked Mafia tattoos. Police in Australia who have dealt with a violent wave of Romanian gangs said that "The Romanians are one of the hardest criminal enterprises to crack due to the fact that they usually only deal with other Romanians and can be extremely violent when needed. Romanian Mafia gangs in the Americas are different than those in the EU, where in the Americas the Romanian mafia has built a very lucrative pact with the Sinaloa Cartel".

Regional and national activities

Italy
In Italy, most of the Romanian criminals are involved in theft and pimping, however, in Turin, they created an Italian-style mafia within their local community, extorting money from Romanian night-clubs that ran prostitutes, and would impose their own businesses and singers on weddings by force.

Also in Turin, Romanian criminals created the 'Brigada Oarza' group, specialized in extortion, robbery and drug trafficking. In 2014, 15 members of the Brigada Oarza were convicted of mafia affiliation, being sentenced up to 15 years in prison. It was the first Italian sentence that condemned a group of Romanian people for mafia-style criminal association. The leader of the Brigada Oarza was allegedly the former professional boxer Viorel Iovu.

Mexico
The Daily Mail first reported Romanian mafia activities in tourist areas of the southeastern state of Quintana Roo in September 2015. The article said that USD $5 million were being stolen via cloned bank cards every month in Cancún, Playa del Carmen, Tulum, and Cozumel, and that the organization had stolen information of 32,000 people. In June 2020, the non-profit organization Mexicanos Contra la Corrupción y la Impunidad ("Mexicans against Corruption and Impunity", MCCI), together with the Organized Crime and Corruption Reporting Project (OCCRP), presented an investigation that demonstrated the Romanian mafia had actually reached Mexico in March 2014 and had spread to other states including Jalisco and Guanajuato. Starting in 2014, the group had a contract to install ATMs in banks in tourist areas, and by mid-2019, it had stolen $1.2 billion. Romanian businessman Florian Tudor ( or "The Shark") was arrested in Quintana Roo in 2019 but released a few hours later for a lack of evidence. Tudor denied his culpability and implicated Constantin Marcu instead. Marcu, a known extortioner, was killed during a supposed kidnapping attempt of Tudor's cousin in 2018. In February 2021, scores of Romanian citizens were arrested at the Cancún airport and, days later, 136 were allowed into the country and four were deported because there was a travel alert against them. The next day, Santiago Nieto, head of Mexico's Financial Intelligence Unit (UIF), announced that 79 accounts of Mexicans and Romanians had been frozen for cloning credit and debit cards. Prominent Mexican business and political leaders were included in the list. Mexican and Venezuelan hackers were also implicated. The Ecologist Green Party of Mexico (PVEM) removed its legislative leader in Quintana Roo, José de la Peña Ruiz de Chávez, for his relationship with the mafia on 10 February 2021.

Most notorious criminal groups 
The capital of Romania, Bucharest, is divided into 6 administrative units called :

 Sector 1: dominated mainly by the Geamănu clan, which became famous after stealing the vehicle of the Romanian businessman George Becali. The Sadoveanu clan operates here too, which is engaged in prostitution.
 Sector 2: controlled by the Caran clan.
 Sector 3: under the control of the Chira clan, known for prostitution.
 Sector 4: Sportivii clan, known for extortion and credit card fraud. The Vancica Clan is also active in this sector, in particular in the cigarette smuggling business.
 Sector 5: Cămătarilor clan, prostitution, loan sharking.
 Sector 6: Luptătorii clan, extortion, usury and racketeering.

References

External links 

 El Chapo's Cartel joins forces with Romanian Gangsters to Smuggle Cocaine

Mafia
Organized crime by ethnic or national origin
Transnational organized crime
Organised crime groups in Australia
Organised crime groups in England
Organised crime groups in Italy
Organized crime groups in Romania
Organised crime groups in Spain